Clytosemia pulchra is a species of beetle in the family Cerambycidae, and the only species in the genus Clytosemia. It was described by Bates in 1884.

References

Desmiphorini
Beetles described in 1884
Monotypic Cerambycidae genera